Dick Lansden Brewbaker (born January 28, 1961) was a Republican member of the Alabama Senate for the 25th district, encompassing parts of Montgomery County and Elmore County.

Biography
Dick Brewbaker attended The Montgomery Academy. He graduated from Vanderbilt University in Nashville, Tennessee. He then taught in a number of schools, including the Montgomery Academy.

He worked as the state director of SCORE 100, an education reform initiative. He was appointed by Governor Fob James as an education liaison to the Alabama House of Representatives and to the Alabama State Board of Education.

From 2003 to 2007, he was a member of the Alabama House of Representatives for the 75th district and then in the Alabama Senate. He is the president and CEO of Brewbaker Motors, a family business started by his grandfather in 1941.

He is married with five children. He attends a Presbyterian church, where he is an elder.

References

1961 births
Living people
Politicians from Montgomery, Alabama
Vanderbilt University alumni
Republican Party members of the Alabama House of Representatives
Republican Party Alabama state senators
American Presbyterians
21st-century American politicians